Tobacco Road is a term used in college sports, mainly basketball, for the four rival universities of North Carolina that play in the Atlantic Coast Conference (ACC). The term refers to the area's history as a major tobacco producer. The Tobacco Road teams represent the following universities: 
 North Carolina Tar Heels (University of North Carolina at Chapel Hill in Chapel Hill)
 Duke Blue Devils (Duke University in Durham)
 NC State Wolfpack (North Carolina State University in Raleigh)
 Wake Forest Demon Deacons (Wake Forest University in Winston-Salem)
North Carolina, Duke, and NC State lie in the Research Triangle and are separated by no more than 25 miles (40 km). Before moving to Winston-Salem in 1956, Wake Forest University was located in the town of Wake Forest within the Triangle region, to the northeast of Raleigh. The schools are historical and present powerhouses among college sports, especially basketball. The universities' proximity and membership in the ACC, coupled with their reputation for academic prestige and as hubs for research and innovation, has created a natural rivalry among students, fans, and alumni.

Basketball

Men's basketball

These four universities are also known in the state as the "Big Four" and competed in the Dixie Classic men's basketball tournament from 1949 to 1961, in which the four schools won all 13 tournaments played. They also played in the Big Four Tournament in Greensboro, North Carolina, from 1971 to 1981. The Wake–Duke rivalry is the oldest basketball rivalry among the four schools in that it dates back to the 1905–06 season and was the first intercollegiate basketball game in North Carolina. The Wake-Duke rivalry is just ahead of the more well known UNC-Duke rivalry in terms of games played by two games. The rivalries between the four schools also account for six of the most frequently played men's basketball rivalries in the ACC. The four schools have a combined 13 men's national basketball championships (UNC has 7 (6 NCAA), Duke has 5, NC State has 2). The four schools also won 2 NIT titles (UNC won 1, and Wake won 1). In the men's tournament they have combined to have 11 runners-up (Duke has 6 and UNC has 5) and 39 Final Fours (UNC has 20, Duke has 16, NC State has 3, and Wake has 1). At least one Tobacco Road team has made the NCAA Tournament every year since 1974. Since the NCAA Tournament started in 1939, all four teams have missed the same tournament eleven times. The years in which none of the teams were in the tournament was 1940, 1942, 1943, 1944, 1945, 1947, 1948, 1949, 1958, 1971, and 1973. All four teams have made the same tournament 4 times (1991, 2003, 2004, 2005). Prior to the 2014 NCAA Tournament, at least one of the teams had made the Sweet 16 since 1979. Aside from the ACC Tournament, the four schools have only played each other in the postseason three times, just once in the NCAA tournament. The first two times came in the NIT Tournament: Wake beat NC State in a semifinal game of the 2000 NIT Tournament and went on to win the  tournament, and UNC beat Duke in a semifinal game of the 1971 NIT Tournament, also winning the tournament. The third time was UNC’s victory over Duke in the Final Four of the 2022 NCAA tournament. The four schools have combined to win 71 men's conference tournaments with 21 SoCon tournaments and 50 ACC tournaments (UNC won 26, Duke won 24, NC State won 17, and Wake Forest won 5). While in the Southern Conference they won or shared 17 SoCon regular season titles between the 1922–23 and 1952–53 seasons. They have also dominated ACC regular season play, having won or shared 52 regular season titles between them, including all but seven since the 1980–81 season.

Women's basketball
While the women's basketball teams have not been as successful, one team from the region has won the NCAA championship with North Carolina, who did so in 1994. They have reached the Final Four on three occasions, reaching in 1994, 2006, and 2007. They have won the Atlantic Coast Conference tournament nine times while winning the regular season title four times. Duke has made the NCAA Tournament Championship twice, losing in 1999 and 2006. They made the Final Four on four occasions (1999, 2002, 2003, 2006). They have won eight ACC tournament championships and twelve regular season titles. NC State has advanced to the Final Four once, doing so in 1998. They have won the ACC Tournament seven times and the regular season six times. Wake Forest has had the least amount of success, as they have only reached the NCAA Tournament on two occasions (1988, 2021). At least one of the four schools has made all but 10 of the 46 combined CIAW, AIAW, and NCAA tournaments since 1969, and all since 1980.

Football

Though the Tobacco Road rivalry predominantly relates to basketball, football between these programs is also competitive. As of the 2014 season, the four schools have combined to appear in 82 bowl games (Duke has 14, UNC has 33, NC State has 32, Wake has 13) and a 46–45–1 record in those games (Duke won 6, UNC won 14, NC State won 17, Wake won 9). They have also shared or won outright a combined 32 conference championships (20 ACC and 12 SoCon). As of the 2015 game, NC State is the only school out of the four to not appear in the ACC Championship Game since the ACC went to a divisional format in 2005. The format divided the four schools in which Wake Forest and NC State were put in the Atlantic Division, while Duke and UNC were put in the Coastal Division. Wake Forest and Duke are "permanent cross-division" rivals, meaning that they play every year regardless of division. The same can be said about UNC and NC State. The Wake–UNC game, as well as the Duke–NC State game, is played two of every twelve years, excluding additional matchups played as non-conference games. In football, the four schools have produced 5 players and no coaches in the Pro Football Hall of Fame. They have also produced 15 players and 6 coaches in the College Football Hall of Fame. The oldest of the football rivalries between the four schools belongs to the UNC-Wake rivalry, which dates back to October 10, 1888 and was the first intercollegiate football game in North Carolina.

†Tiebreakers are determined by who won head-to-head matchup. With no trophy, it is possible to split the title 3 or 4 ways.
The 2020 UNC-Wake Forest Game did not count as an ACC Conference Win

Baseball
In baseball, the four schools won a combined 15 ACC Baseball Tournaments (UNC won 6, NC State and Wake won 4, Duke won 1). In the College World Series, Wake Forest held the only national championship of any ACC school while a member of the ACC in 1955 until Virginia won it in 2015. Other schools have national championships, but all came before joining the ACC, or since leaving the ACC in the case of South Carolina. Wake was the runner-up in 1949, while UNC was the runner-up in 2006 and 2007.

Soccer
In men's soccer, the four schools have won a combined four national titles (UNC has 2, Wake has 1, Duke has 1), three NCAA runners-up (Duke with 2, UNC with 1), 11 ACC Tournament titles, and won or shared 7 ACC regular season titles. Women's soccer has produced much more success among the four schools. On the national level, they have combined for 21 national championships (UNC won all 21), six NCAA runners-up (UNC with 3, Duke with 2, NC State with 1). Tobacco Road teams have won 22 ACC tournaments since its inception in 1987. The years not won by a Tobacco Road team are 1987, 2004, 2011, 2012, and 2013. They have also won or shared 20 ACC regular season titles since 1987. UNC's 21 national titles in women's soccer are the most among Division 1 schools.

Lacrosse 
Only Duke and North Carolina currently compete in men's and women's lacrosse, though NC State had a program in the 1970s and 1980s. The current two Tobacco Road competitors have had a significant presence on the national stage, as the Blue Devils have won three national titles (2010, 2013, 2014), while the Tar Heels lay claim to five (1981, 1982, 1986, 1991, 2016). Duke and North Carolina have met 75 times, with UNC leading the rivalry 42–33 through 2020. However, Duke leads the ACC and NCAA postseason series by records of 9–4 and 4–0 respectively. For further information, see Duke–North Carolina lacrosse rivalry.

Overall team national championships
As of 2020, the four schools have combined to win 73 NCAA team national championships in both men's and women's sports.

See also
 Duke–North Carolina rivalry
 North Carolina–NC State rivalry
 NC State–Wake Forest rivalry
 North Carolina–Wake Forest rivalry

References

Duke Blue Devils
NC State Wolfpack
North Carolina Tar Heels
Wake Forest Demon Deacons
University of North Carolina at Chapel Hill rivalries
College sports in North Carolina